Nathan Malik Meadors (born February 13, 1997) is an American football safety for the St. Louis BattleHawks of the XFL. He played college football at UCLA.

Early life and high school
Meadors was born and grew up in San Bernardino, California and attended San Gorgonio High School. He was San Gorgonio's starting quarterback as a senior and was named All-CIF Inland Division after passing for 1,481 yards and 22 touchdowns with four interceptions while also rushing for 1,971 yards and 26 touchdowns.

College career
Meadors played four seasons for the UCLA Bruins. Meadors led the Bruins with nine passes broken up and had 55 tackles and an interception, which he returned for a touchdown, in his junior season. As a senior, he recorded 37 tackles, three passes defended, two tackles for loss, one sack and one interception in 10 games played. Meadors finished his collegiate career with 149 tackles, 22 passes broken up and three interceptions in 42 games played (30 starts).

Professional career

Minnesota Vikings
Meadors signed with the Minnesota Vikings as an undrafted free agent on April 29, 2019. He was waived by the team during final roster cuts on August 31, 2019 but was re-signed to the team's practice squad the next day. He was promoted to the active roster on September 12, 2019. Meadors made his NFL debut on September 15, 2019 in a 21-16 loss against the Green Bay Packers. He was waived on September 28, 2019 and re-signed to the practice squad. He was promoted to the active roster on January 10, 2020.

Meadors was waived by the Vikings during final roster cuts on September 5, 2020, and signed to the practice squad the next day. He was promoted to the active roster on September 12, 2020. He was waived on September 18 and re-signed to the practice squad on September 22. He was released on September 28, 2020.

Jacksonville Jaguars
On October 19, 2020, Meadors was signed to the Jacksonville Jaguars' practice squad. He was elevated to the active roster on December 5 for the team's week 13 game against the Minnesota Vikings, and reverted to the practice squad after the game. He signed a reserve/future contract on January 4, 2021. He was waived on May 4, 2021.

Philadelphia Eagles
On May 14, 2021, Meadors signed with the Philadelphia Eagles. He was waived/injured on August 4, 2021 and placed on injured reserve. He was released on August 13.

Cleveland Browns
Meadors was signed to the Cleveland Browns' practice squad on November 9, 2021. The Browns signed Meadors to a reserve/futures contract on January 10, 2022. He was waived on August 3, 2022.

New York Giants
On August 4, 2022, Meadors was claimed off waivers by the New York Giants. He was waived on August 30, 2022 and signed to the practice squad the next day. On September 1, 2022, he was released.

Tennessee Titans
The St. Louis BattleHawks selected Meadors in the fourth round of the 2023 XFL Supplemental Draft on January 1, 2023, but signed with the Tennessee Titans on their practice squad the next day.

References

External links
UCLA Bruins bio
Minnesota Vikings bio

1997 births
Living people
Players of American football from California
Sportspeople from San Bernardino, California
American football cornerbacks
UCLA Bruins football players
Minnesota Vikings players
Jacksonville Jaguars players
Philadelphia Eagles players
Cleveland Browns players
New York Giants players
Tennessee Titans players
St. Louis BattleHawks players